The Alcàsser Murders is a Spanish true crime documentary television series that premiered on Netflix on 14 June 2019, directed by Elías León and starring Luisa Gómez, Martín García and Fernando García. It explores the 1992 event of three teenage girls from the small town of Alcàsser, Spain being kidnapped, raped, tortured and murdered and the media circus it created in the country at the time.

Premise
The Alcàsser Murders explores the 1992 event of three teenage girls from the small town of Alcàsser, Spain being kidnapped, raped, tortured and murdered and the media circus it created in the country at the time. The series contains new interviews and archival footage of news reports and eye-witness accounts.

Cast
 Luisa Gómez
 Martín García
 Fernando García
 José Manuel Alcayna
 Teresa Domínguez
 Yolanda Laguna
 Ana Sanmartín
 Elías León
 Patricia Murray

References

External links
 
 
 

Spanish-language Netflix original programming
Spanish documentary television series
True crime television series
2019 Spanish television series debuts
2019 Spanish television series endings